Marcus Ljungqvist (born October 26, 1974, in Falun) is a Swedish former professional road bicycle racer. He turned professional in 1998, and retired from racing after the 2009 season. He finished 4th in the road race at the 2005 UCI Road World Championships, which is the best placement ever for a Swedish rider.

Career achievements

Major results

1996
 1st  Road race, National Road Championships
1998
 1st Stage 2 Tour of Japan
 3rd Overall Tour of Sweden
1999
 1st Stage 11 Tour de Langkawi
2000
 7th Hel van het Mergelland
 10th Overall Tour of Sweden
2001
 1st  Road race, National Road Championships
 1st Stage 3 Rheinland-Pfalz Rundfahrt
 1st Stage 3 Tour of Rhodes
 2nd Boucles de l'Aulne
 3rd Overall Tour de Normandie
1st Stage 5
 4th GP Aarhus
 10th Overall Danmark Rundt
2002
 1st  Overall Tour de Luxembourg
1st Stage 2
 1st Paris–Camembert
 1st Route Adélie
 6th Overall Tour of Rhodes
 6th Overall Étoile de Bessèges
 7th GP de Fourmies
 7th Overall Tour of Sweden
 8th Grand Prix Pino Cerami
 8th Rund um den Henninger Turm
2004
 1st Scandinavian Open Road Race
 2nd Road race, National Road Championships
 5th E3 Harelbeke
2005
 4th Road race, UCI Road World Championships
2006
 1st Stage 2 Paris–Corrèze
 3rd Time trial, National Road Championships
 5th Grand Prix Herning
 5th Brabantse Pijl
 6th E3 Harelbeke
2007
 2nd Overall Tour of Ireland
 2nd Monte Paschi Eroica
2009
 1st  Road race, National Road Championships

Grand Tour general classification results timeline

References

External links 
 Official homepage 
 Team CSC profile

1974 births
Living people
Swedish male cyclists
Olympic cyclists of Sweden
Cyclists at the 2004 Summer Olympics
Cyclists at the 2008 Summer Olympics
People from Falun
Sportspeople from Dalarna County